William Blanchard may refer to:

 William H. Blanchard (1916–1966), United States Air Force officer
 William Isaac Blanchard (died 1790), English stenographer
 William Blanchard (comedian) (1769–1835), English comedian
 William Blanchard (footballer) (1889–1963), English footballer

See also
 William Blanchard Jerrold (1826–1884), English journalist and author